William Ledyard Mitchell (November 2, 1881 – May 18, 1964) was an American automobile executive and All-American college football player. A native of Cincinnati, Ohio, Mitchell graduated from Yale University, where he was selected as a fullback on the 1903 College Football All-America Team. Members of the Yale Class of 1904 created the Ledyard Mitchell Cup trophy awarded each year to a Yale player for proficiency in punting. Mitchell became president of the Maxwell Motor Car Company in 1917. When Maxwell folded, Mitchell was appointed the receiver. In 1922, he became vice president in charge of manufacturing when Maxwell's manufacturing operations were merged into Chrysler Corporation. He was named secretary and vice president in charge of manufacturing in the early days of Chrysler. In 1926, he became general manager of operations for Chrysler with responsibility for Chrysler's five manufacturing plants. And in 1931, he was named chairman of Chrysler Export Corporation.

Mitchell was married in 1910 to Sara Moulton Sherman.  The couple had five children, Sara Sherman Mitchell, William Ledyard Mitchell, Jr., Mary Sherman Mitchell, Frank Sherman Mitchell and Ann Sherman Mitchell. Mitchell died on May 18, 1964, at his home in Grosse Pointe Farms, Michigan.

References

1881 births
1964 deaths
American football fullbacks
Chrysler executives
Yale Bulldogs football players
All-American college football players
People in the automobile industry
Businesspeople from Cincinnati
Players of American football from Cincinnati
20th-century American businesspeople